Louvakou (can also be written as Luvaku) is a district in the Niari Region of south-western Republic of the Congo. The capital lies at Louvakou.

Towns and villages

Niari Department
Districts of the Republic of the Congo